Theodore Bryant Comstock (1849–1915) was an American explorer and geologist.

Biography
Theodore B. Comstock was born in Cuyahoga Falls, Ohio on July 27, 1849. He earned a bachelor's degree at Pennsylvania State Agricultural College, and postgraduate degrees from Cornell University.

He was a professor of general and economic geology at Cornell University from 1875 to 1879, and a professor of mining engineering and physics at the University of Illinois from
1885 to 1889.

He married Blanche Huggins in 1880.

He served as first president of the University of Arizona from 1894 to 1895. He received a Bachelor of Arts degree from what is now Pennsylvania State University in 1868, a Bachelor of Science in 1870 and D.Sc. in 1886 from Cornell University.

Theodore B. Comstock died at his home in Los Angeles on July 26, 1915.

Works
 Reports on the Geology of Northwestern Wyoming (1874)
 Outline of General Geology (1878)
 Map of San Juan County, Colo. (1882)
 Reports on gold and silver, Arkansas survey, and on the central mineral region of Texas (1889)

He made contributions to American Naturalist, the American Journal of Science, and the Engineering and Mining Journal.

References

Cornell University alumni
Pennsylvania State University alumni
Cornell University faculty
University of Illinois faculty
University of Arizona faculty
Presidents of the University of Arizona
1849 births
1915 deaths
People from Cuyahoga Falls, Ohio